Manuela Escamilla (1648–1721) was a Spanish playwright, stage actress and theatre manager. She belonged to the playwrights of the Spanish Golden Age. She was the daughter of Francisca Díaz and Antonio Escamilla, a successful actress in 1654–1677 and the manager of her father's theater company in 1683–1690.

References

1648 births
1721 deaths
17th-century Spanish actresses
Spanish theatre directors
17th-century theatre managers
17th-century Spanish writers
Spanish Golden Age
Women theatre managers and producers
17th-century Spanish businesswomen
17th-century Spanish businesspeople